Neachrostia undulata is a moth of the family Erebidae first described by George Hampson in 1893. It is found in Sri Lanka and China.

References

External links
Hong Kong Fauna, A selected list

Moths of Asia
Moths described in 1893
Calpinae